Kuma or KUMA may refer to:

Characters
 Kuma, a bear also known as Teddie in Persona 4
 Kuma (Tekken), father and son characters of the same name in the Tekken franchise
 Kuma Lisa, an archetypal character from Bulgarian and Russian folklore
 Bartholomew Kuma, a character in the Japanese anime and manga One Piece
 Pedobear, a mascot of website 2channel

Radio stations
 KUMA (AM), a radio station (1290 AM) in Pendleton, Oregon, United States
 KUMA-FM, a radio station (92.1 FM) in Pilot Rock, Oregon, United States
 KWVN-FM, a radio station (107.7 FM) in Pendleton, Oregon, United States, previously known as KUMA-FM
 KUMA (Arizona), a defunct radio station in Yuma, Arizona, United States

Places

Japan
Kuma, Ehime, a former town
Kuma, Kumamoto, a village
 Kuma District, Kumamoto, Japan
Kuma River (Japan)
Mount Kuma, a stratovolcano

Myanmar
Kuma, Myanmar, a town

Russia
Kuma (Russia), a river in the Northern Caucasus
Kuma, Republic of Dagestan, a rural locality in Dagestan, Russia

People
 Kuma Demeksa (born 1958), Ethiopian politician
 Abera Kuma (born 1990), Ethiopian long-distance runner
 Eyerusalem Kuma (born 1981), Ethiopian long-distance runner
 Kengo Kuma (born 1954), Japanese architect

Technology 
 Kuma (processor), an Athlon X2 core based on Phenom CPU
 Kuma (ship), a Kuma class Imperial Japanese Navy cruiser
Kuma-class cruiser, light cruisers operated by the Imperial Japanese Navy
 Kuma (software), the platform that powers MDN

Other uses 
 6255 Kuma, a main-belt asteroid
 Kuma (film), a 2012 film directed by Umut Dag
 Kuma (star), a traditional name for the star Nu Draconis
 Kuma Reality Games, a video game developer
 Kuma (Cap), a traditional Omani cap
 Kuma (acoel), a genus of acoels in the family Proporidae

See also
Cuma (disambiguation)